The multi-commodity flow problem is a network flow problem with multiple commodities (flow demands) between different source and sink nodes.

Definition

Given a flow network , where edge  has capacity . The variable  defines the fraction of flow  along edge , where  in case the flow can be split among multiple paths, and  otherwise (i.e. "single path routing"). Find an assignment of all flow variables which satisfies the following four constraints:

(1) Link capacity: The sum of all flows routed over a link does not exceed its capacity.

(2) Flow conservation on transit nodes: The amount of a flow entering an intermediate node  is the same that exits the node.

(3) Flow conservation at the source: A flow must exit its source node completely.

(4) Flow conservation at the destination: A flow must enter its sink node completely.

Corresponding optimization problems

Load balancing is the attempt to route flows such that the utilization  of all links  is even, where

The problem can be solved e.g. by minimizing . A common linearization of this problem is the minimization of the maximum utilization , where

You then need to minimize 

In the maximum multi-commodity flow problem, the demand of each commodity is not fixed, and the total throughput is maximized by maximizing the sum of all demands

Relation to other problems

The minimum cost variant of the multi-commodity flow problem is a generalization of the minimum cost flow problem (in which there is merely one source  and one sink . Variants of the circulation problem are generalizations of all flow problems. That is, any flow problem can be viewed as a particular circulation problem.

Usage

Routing and wavelength assignment (RWA) in optical burst switching of Optical Network would be approached via multi-commodity flow formulas.

Register allocation can be modeled as an integer minimum cost multi-commodity flow problem: Values produced by instructions are source nodes, values consumed by instructions are sink nodes and registers as well as stack slots are edges.

Solutions

In the decision version of problems, the problem of producing an integer flow satisfying all demands is NP-complete, even for only two commodities and unit capacities (making the problem strongly NP-complete in this case). 

If fractional flows are allowed, the problem can be solved in polynomial time through linear programming, or through (typically much faster) fully polynomial time approximation schemes.

Applications
Multicommodify flow is applied in the overlay routing in content delivery.

External resources
 Papers by Clifford Stein about this problem: http://www.columbia.edu/~cs2035/papers/#mcf
 Software solving the problem: https://web.archive.org/web/20130306031532/http://typo.zib.de/opt-long_projects/Software/Mcf/

References

Network flow problem

Add: Jean-Patrice Netter, Flow Augmenting Meshings: a primal type of approach to the maximum integer flow in a muti-commodity network, Ph.D dissertation Johns Hopkins University, 1971